List of notable alumni and faculty of the Cardiff School of Journalism, Media and Cultural Studies.

Alumni

Faculty

Current 
 Prof Stuart Allen (Head of School)
Prof Richard Sambrook (Deputy Head of School and Director - Centre for Journalism)
John Hartley
Ian Hargreaves

Former 

 Sir David English (-1991)

References

Cardiff University